Hans im Glück aus Herne 2 is a German television series.

See also
List of German television series

External links
 

1983 German television series debuts
1983 German television series endings
Television shows set in North Rhine-Westphalia
German-language television shows
ZDF original programming